Events in the year 1948 in Brazil.

Incumbents

Federal government
 President: Marshal Eurico Gaspar Dutra 
 Vice President: Nereu Ramos

Governors 
 Alagoas: Silvestre Pericles
 Amazonas: Leopoldo da Silva Amorim Neves
 Bahia: Otávio Mangabeira 
 Ceará: Faustino de Albuquerque 
 Espírito Santo: Carlos Fernando Monteiro Lindenberg 
 Goiás: Jerônimo Coimbra Bueno 
 Maranhão: 
 Mato Grosso: Arnaldo Estêvão de Figueiredo
 Minas Gerais: Milton Soares Campos 
 Pará: Luís de Moura Carvalho 
 Paraíba: Osvaldo Trigueiro 
 Paraná: Moisés Lupion 
 Pernambuco: Otávio Correia de Araújo (till 14 February); Alexandre Barbosa Lima Sobrinho (from 14 February)
 Piauí: José da Rocha Furtado 
 Rio de Janeiro: Macedo Soares 
 Rio Grande do Norte: José Augusto Varela 
 Rio Grande do Sul: Walter Só Jobim 
 Santa Catarina: Aderbal Ramos da Silva 
 São Paulo: Ademar de Barros 
 Sergipe: Jose Rollemberg

Vice governors
 Ceará: Francisco de Menezes Pimentel 
 Espírito Santo: José Rodrigues Sette 
 Goiás: Hosanah de Campos Guimarães (till 30 June); vacant thereafter (from 30 June)
 Maranhão: Saturnino Bello
 Minas Gerais: José Ribeiro Pena 
 Paraíba: José Targino Pereira da Costa 
 Piauí: Osvaldo da Costa e Silva 
 Rio Grande do Norte: Tomaz Salustino
 São Paulo: Luís Gonzaga Novelli Júnior

Events

August - Brazil's team at the Summer Olympics in London compete in eleven sports and win a bronze medal in the basketball competition.
date unknown 
The municipality of Paiçandu is founded by the Companhia de Melhoramentos do Norte do Paraná.
The Escola de Arte Dramática (School of Dramatic Art) is founded by Alfredo Mesquita in São Paulo.
Opening of the headquarters of the Banco Boavista, designed by Oscar Niemeyer.

Arts and culture

Books
Alfonso Arinos - Pelo Sertão, with illustrations by Livio Abramo

Films
Folias Cariocas, directed by Manoel Jorge and Hélio Thys, starring Dercy Gonçalves.
Poeira de Estrelas, directed by Moacyr Fenelon and starring Lourdinha Bittencourt and Emilinha Borba.

Births
January 11 - José Scheinkman, economist
February 16 - Ellen Gracie, judge
March 7 - Danilo Caymmi, musician, singer, composer and arranger, son of Dorival Caymmi
March 15 - Sérgio Vieira de Mello, UN diplomat (died 2003)
June 27 - Zezé Motta, actress and singer
August 12 - Ana de Hollanda, politician
September 12 - Caio Fernando Abreu, writer (died 1998)
December 25 - Joel Santana, footballer and manager

Deaths
July 4 - Monteiro Lobato, writer (born 1882)
August 27 - Oscar Lorenzo Fernández, composer (born 1897)
date unknown - Humberto Rosa, painter (born 1908)

References

See also 
1948 in Brazilian football
List of Brazilian films of 1948

 
1940s in Brazil
Years of the 20th century in Brazil
Brazil
Brazil